Roberts is a census-designated place and unincorporated town in Carbon County, Montana, United States. As of the 2010 census it had a population of 361. 

Originally named Merritt, Roberts began as a Northern Pacific Railroad siding in 1893. The town was platted in 1902.

Situated on U.S. Route 212, Roberts is about 12 miles from Red Lodge. Rock Creek flows south of town.

Demographics

Climate
The Köppen Climate Classification subtype for this climate is "Dfb" (Warm Summer Continental Climate).

Education
It is home to the Roberts School District, which enrolls 64 students as of 2013. Roberts High School is a Class C school (less than 108 students) which helps determine athletic competitions. They are known as the Rockets.

Notable people
Ronald Eugene Stein, Air Force Lt. Colonel Vietnam Hero Awarded Silver Star

References

Census-designated places in Carbon County, Montana
Unincorporated communities in Montana
Census-designated places in Montana
Unincorporated communities in Carbon County, Montana